James A. Pedro (born October 30, 1970) is an American retired World Championship and Olympic judoka and current judo coach. 
Pedro  currently holds a 7th degree black belt in judo. He is the coach of Kayla Harrison, the first American ever to win an Olympic gold medal in judo.

Early life and education
Pedro was born on October 30, 1970 in Danvers, Massachusetts. He was trained by his father James Pedro Sr., a 1976 Olympic Alternate. Pedro is currently a 7th degree Black Belt in judo, and also has a Bachelor of Arts (BA) in Business Economics and Organizational Behavior & Management from Brown University, whom he also wrestled for. His favorite judo technique is Sode Tsuri Komi Goshi, and his most effective is Juji Gatame.

Achievements
Pedro was the World Champion at 73 kg in 1999 after defeating Vitaly Makarov of Russia in the final, and also won bronze medals in the 1991 and 1995 World Championships. Pedro represented the United States in the 1992, 1996, 2000, and 2004 Olympic Games, winning bronze in 1996 and 2004. His entry in the "Legends" section of a major judo magazine's web site lists 29 gold medals in international competition.

National honors
 04, 03, 00 & 99 Real Judo Magazine "Player of the Year"
 04 New York Athletic Club Hall of Fame
 04 Brown University Hall of Fame
 97 New York Athletic Club "Athlete of the Year"
 97 Black Belt Hall of Fame
 10x USJA Jr. National Champion
 6x US National Champion (89, 91, 93, 94, 99, 03)
 3x High School National Champion (86, 87, 88)

Gold major international medals
 04 & 00 German Team Championships (73 kg Member of TSV Abensberg)
 04 & 03 New York Open (73 kg) - Manhattan, NY
 04 Pan Am Championships (73 kg) - Margarita Island, Venezuela
 03 Korean Open (73 kg) - Yongin University, Korea
 03 Rendez Vous Canada (73 kg) - Montreal, QC
 03 Tre Torri (73 kg) - Porto Sant'Elpidio, Italy
 03 Puerto Rico Open (73 kg) - Salinas, Puerto Rico
 03 British Open (73 kg) - London, England
 00 Europa Cup Team Championships (73 kg Member of TSV Abensberg)
 99 World Championships (73 kg) - Birmingham, England
 99 Pan Am Games (73 kg) - Winnipeg, Canada
 98 US Open (73 kg) - Colorado Springs, CO, USA
 98 Pan Am Championships (73 kg) - Santo Domingo, Dominican Republic
 98 French Open (73 kg) - Paris, France
 98 Austrian Open (73 kg) - Leonding, Austria
 98 Shoriki Cup (73 kg) - Tokyo, Japan
 97 & 95 German Open (71 kg) - Munich, Germany
 97 Pan Am Championships (71 kg) - Guadalajara, Mexico
 95 US Open (71 kg) - Macon, GA, USA
 95 Pan Am Games (71 kg) - Mar de Plata, Argentina
 93 Pacific Rim Championships (65 kg) - Auckland, New Zealand
 92 Guido Sieni (65 kg) - Sassari, Italy
 92 Pan Am Championships (65 kg) - Santiago, Chile
 92 US Open (71 kg) - Colorado Springs, CO, USA
 90 & 89 US Open (65 kg) - Colorado Springs, CO, USA
 90 Tre Torri (65 kg) - Porto Sant'Elpidio, Italy

Silver major international medals
 04 Hungarian Open (73 kg) - Budapest, Hungary
 04 German Open (73 kg) - Hamburg, Germany
 03 US Open (73 kg) - Las Vegas, NV
 93 Korean Open (65 kg) - Seoul, Korea
 93 French Open (63 kg) - Paris, France
 92 Hungarian Open (65 kg) - Budapest, Hungary
 90 Goodwill Games (65 kg) - Seattle, WA, USA

Bronze major international medals
 04 Olympic Games (73 kg) - Athens, Greece
 99 Kano Cup (73 kg) - Tokyo, Japan
 98 German Open (73 kg) - Munich, Germany
 97 Austrian Open (71 kg) - Leonding, Austria
 96 French Open (71 kg) - Paris, France
 96 Olympic Games (73 kg) - Atlanta, GA, USA
 95 World Championships (71 kg) - Makuhari, Japan
 95 Pacific Rim Championships (71 kg) - Sydney, Australia
 94 Goodwill Games (71 kg) - St. Petersburg, Russia
 92 French Open (65 kg) - Paris, France
 92 German Open (65 kg) - Munich, Germany
 91 US Open (65 kg) - Colorado Springs, CO, USA
 91 Pan Am Games (65 kg) - Havana, Cuba
 91 World Championships (65 kg) - Barcelona, Spain
 91 Pacific Rim Championships (65 kg) - Honolulu, HI, USA
 90 Jr. World Championships (65 kg) - Dijon, France
 90 Tblissi International (65 kg) - Tblissi, Georgia
 88 Shoriki Cup (65 kg) - Tokyo, Japan

5th place in major international events
 00 Olympic Games (73 kg) - Sydney, Australia
 94 Kano Cup (71 kg) - Tokyo, Japan
 93 World Championships (65 kg) - Hamilton, Canada

Post-competition career
Pedro retired from competitive judo after the 2004 Olympics. He has worked for Monster.com, promoted a brand of tatami training mats used for judo and jujutsu practice and competition, and been the subject of a biographical movie.  A newaza (ground techniques) specialist, Jimmy currently owns and operates Pedro's Judo Center in Wakefield, Massachusetts and teaches clinics and seminars throughout the country. Pedro also coached the  U.S. Olympic Judo team at the 2012 Olympics in London. He is  the national sales executive for FUJI Mats + Facility Design. He is Kayla Harrison's coach. Harrison was the first American to win an Olympic gold medal in judo. 
Fury on the mat is a biographical movie about Jimmy Pedro. Pedro currently owns and operates the renowned Mat and Outfitting company, www.FujiMats.com and sister company www.fujisports.com

Personal life
Pedro is   married and the father of four children.

Notable students
Kayla Harrison (2x Olympic Champion)
Travis Stevens (3x Olympian and 2016 Olympic Silver medalist)
Ronda Rousey (2008 Olympic Bronze Medalist and former UFC Champion)
Rick Hawn (Olympian and Bellator Tournament Champion)
Janine Nakao (Pan American Silver Medalist)
Taraje Williams-Murray (2x Olympian)

References

Published works
 Judo Techniques and Tactics, Jimmy Pedro and William Durbin.

External links
 
 Pedro's Judo Center

1970 births
Living people
American male judoka
Olympic judoka of the United States
Olympic bronze medalists for the United States in judo
Judoka at the 1992 Summer Olympics
Judoka at the 1996 Summer Olympics
Judoka at the 2000 Summer Olympics
Judoka at the 2004 Summer Olympics
Judoka at the 1991 Pan American Games
Judoka at the 1995 Pan American Games
Judoka at the 1999 Pan American Games
People from Methuen, Massachusetts
World judo champions
Medalists at the 2004 Summer Olympics
Medalists at the 1996 Summer Olympics
Pan American Games medalists in judo
Pan American Games gold medalists for the United States
Pan American Games bronze medalists for the United States
Brown Bears athletes
Goodwill Games medalists in judo
Competitors at the 1990 Goodwill Games
Competitors at the 1994 Goodwill Games
Medalists at the 1991 Pan American Games
Sportspeople from Essex County, Massachusetts